William O'Donoghue (born 1994) is an Irish hurler who plays as a midfielder for club side Na Piarsaigh which he captains and at inter-county level with the Limerick senior hurling team.

Playing career

Club

O'Donoghue joined the Na Piarsaigh club at a young age and played in all grades at juvenile and underage levels, enjoying championship success in the under-16, minor and under-21 grades.

On 6 October 2013, O'Donoghue was at right wing-forward when Na Piarsaigh defeated Adare by 0-14 to 0-12 to win the Limerick Senior Championship. He was switched to midfield for the subsequent Munster Championship, which culminated with him winning a provincial medal after a 4-14 to 0-08 defeat of Sixmilebridge in the final.

O'Donoghue won a second Limerick Championship medal on 11 October 2015 after a 1-22 to 4-12 defeat of Patrickswell in the final. Later that season he won a second Munster medal after a 2-18 to 2-11 defeat of Ballygunner. On 17 March 2016, O'Donoghue won an All-Ireland medal when Na Piarsaigh defeated Ruairí Óg by 2-25 to 2-14 in the final.

On 15 October 2017, O'Donoghue won a third Limerick Championship medal when Na Piarsaigh defeated Kilmallock by 1-22 to 2-14 in the final. He later won a third Munster Championship medal when Na Piarsaigh defeated Ballygunner by 3-15 to 2-10 in the final. On 17 March 2018, O'Donoghue was at midfield when Na Piarsaigh were defeated by Cuala in the All-Ireland final.

On 27 October 2018, O'Donoghue won a fourth Limerick Championship medal as captain following Na Piarsaigh's 2-22 to 3-10 defeat of Doon.

O'Donoghue retained the captaincy for the 2019 championship, however, Na Piarsaigh surrendered their title following a 1-17 to 0-15 defeat by Patrickswell in the 2019 final.

On 19 September 2020, O'Donoghue captained Na Piarsaigh in a third consecutive final and their eighth overall in ten seasons. He ended the game with a fifth winners' medal after the 5-27 to 1-12 victory over Doon.

Inter-county

Under-21

O'Donoghue joined the Limerick under-21 hurling team in 2014. He later joined the Limerick under-21 Gaelic football team.

Senior

On 19 February 2017, O'Donoghue made his first appearance for the Limerick senior hurling team in a 6-21 to 3-08 defeat of Kerry in the National Hurling League. In the subsequent league semi-final against Tipperary he scored his first goal in a 1-21 to 1-11 defeat by Tipperary.

On 19 August 2018, O'Donoghue was introduced as a 66th-minute substitute for Darragh O'Donovan when Limerick won their first All-Ireland title in 45 years after a 3-16 to 2-18 defeat of Galway in the final.

In December 2018, O'Donoghue was included on the Limerick panel for the upcoming season. Injury ruled him out of the National League, however, he returned to training in March 2019. On 30 June 2019, O'Donoghue won a Munster Championship medal at midfield following Limerick's 2-26 to 2-14 defeat of Tipperary in the final. He ended the year by receiving his first All-Star nomination.

Career statistics

Honours

Na Piarsaigh
All-Ireland Senior Club Hurling Championship (1): 2016
Munster Senior Club Hurling Championship (3): 2013, 2015, 2017
Limerick Senior Hurling Championship (5): 2013, 2015, 2017, 2018 (c), 2020 (c), 2022 (c)

Limerick
All-Ireland Senior Hurling Championship (2): 2018, 2020, 2021, 2022
Munster Senior Hurling Championship (3): 2019, 2020, 2021, 2022
National Hurling League (1): 2020

Awards
The Sunday Game Team of the Year (1): 2021
 GAA/GPA All-Star (1): 2021

References

1995 births
Living people
Dual players
Na Piarsaigh (Limerick) hurlers
Limerick inter-county hurlers
Limerick Gaelic footballers
All Stars Awards winners (hurling)